The South African Railways Class 6E1, Series 7 of 1977 was an electric locomotive.

Between 1977 and 1979, the South African Railways placed 150 Class 6E1,  electric locomotives with a Bo-Bo wheel arrangement in mainline service.

Manufacturer

The 3 kV DC Class 6E1, Series 7 electric locomotive was designed and built for the South African Railways (SAR) by Union Carriage & Wagon (UCW) in Nigel, Transvaal. The electrical equipment was supplied by the General Electric Company (GEC).

The 150 units were delivered between 1977 and 1979, numbered in the range from E1746 to E1895. Like Series 6, the Series 7 units were equipped with AEI-283AY traction motors. UCW did not allocate builder’s or works numbers to the locomotives it built for the SAR and used the SAR unit numbers for their record keeping.

Characteristics

Orientation
These dual cab locomotives had a roof access ladder on one side only, just to the right of the cab access door. The roof access ladder end was marked as the no. 2 end. A corridor along the centre of the unit connected the cabs which were identical apart from the fact that the handbrake was located in cab 2. A pantograph hook stick was stowed in a tube mounted below the lower edge of the locomotive body on the roof access ladder side. The locomotive had one square and two rectangular access panels along the lower half of the body on the roof access ladder side, and only one square access panel on the opposite side.

Series identifying features

The Class 6E1 was produced in eleven series over a period of nearly sixteen years. While some Class 6E1 series are visually indistinguishable from their predecessors or successors, some externally visible changes did occur over the years.

The Series 6 and Series 7 locomotives are visually indistinguishable from each other, but can be distinguished from all the older series models by the rainwater beading that had been added above the small grilles on the sides aft of the side doors. Beginning with Series 8, all subsequent series had a large hatch door on each side to the right of their side doors.

Crew access
The Class 5E, 5E1, 6E and 6E1 locomotives were notoriously difficult to enter from ground level since their lever-style door handles were at waist level when standing inside the cab, making it impossible to open the door from outside without first climbing up high enough to reach the door handle while hanging on to the side handrails with one hand only. Crews therefore often chose to leave the doors ajar when parking and exiting the units.

Late-model Series 7 locomotives were equipped with side doors on which the outside door latch handle was mounted near floor level with a simple drawer pull type handle at mid-door level. Unit no. E1845 and later numbers were observed with such lower mounted door handles. Unit no. E1882 was one observed exception with a high-mounted door handle, although this may have been the result of a door replacement.

Service
The Class 6E1 family saw service all over both 3 kV DC mainline and branch line networks, the smaller Cape Western mainline between Cape Town and Beaufort West and the larger network which covers portions of the Northern Cape, the Free State, Natal, Gauteng, North West and Mpumalanga.

Reclassification and rebuilding

Reclassification to Class 16E

During 1990 and 1991, Spoornet semi-permanently coupled several pairs of otherwise largely unmodified Class 6E1 units, reclassified them to Class 16E and allocated a single locomotive number to each pair, with the individual units in the pairs inscribed "A" or "B". The aim was to accomplish savings on cab maintenance by coupling the units at their no. 1 ends, abandoning the no. 1 end cabs in terms of maintenance and using only the no. 2 end cabs. Most pairs were later either disbanded with the units reverting to Class 6E1 and regaining their original numbers or getting rebuilt to Class 18E.

Twelve known Series 7 locomotives were part of such Class 16E pairs.
 E1790 became 16-407B.
 E1840 and E1841 became 16-409 A and B.
 E1846 and E1847 became 16-404 A and B.
 E1848 and E1849 became 16-405 A and B.
 E1850 and E1851 became 16-410 A and B.
 E1858 and E1859 became 16-411 A and B.
 E1870 became 16-406B.

Modification to Class 17E

Class 17E locomotives were modified and reclassified from Class 6E1, Series 7, 8 and 9 locomotives during 1993 and 1994. Key modifications included improved regenerative braking and wheel-slip control to improve their reliability on the steep gradients and curves of the Natal mainline. Unlike the unmodified but reclassified Class 16E locomotives, the Class 17Es retained their original unit numbers after reclassification.

A stumbling block was that the regeneration equipment at many of the sub-stations along the route was unreliable. Since there was no guarantee that another train would be in the same section to absorb the regenerated energy, there was always the risk that line voltage could exceed 4.1 kV which would make either the sub-station or the locomotive trip out. As a result, the subsequently rebuilt Class 18E locomotives were not equipped with regenerative braking.

Fourteen Series 7 units are known to have been modified and reclassified to Class 17E, their numbers being E1749, E1775, E1776, E1777, E1778, E1801, E1803, E1805, E1810, E1822, E1826, E1827, E1832 and E1843. Twelve of them were subsequently rebuilt to Class 18E, the exceptions being numbers E1778 and E1803.

Rebuilding to Class 18E

In 2000, Spoornet began a project to rebuild Series 2 to 11 Class 6E1 locomotives to Class 18E, Series 1 and Series 2 at the Transnet Rail Engineering (TRE) workshops at Koedoespoort. In the process, the cab at the no. 1 end was stripped of all controls and the driver's front and side windows were blanked off to have a toilet installed, thereby forfeiting the locomotive's bi-directional ability.

Since the driving cab's noise level had to be below 85 decibels, cab 2 was selected as the Class 18E driving cab primarily based on its lower noise level compared to cab 1, which is closer and more exposed to the compressor's noise and vibration. Another factor was the closer proximity of cab 2 to the low voltage switch panel. The fact that the handbrake was located in cab 2 was not a deciding factor, but was considered an additional benefit.

Most of the Class 6E1, Series 7 units which were used in this project were rebuilt to Class 18E, Series 1 locomotives. The known numbers and renumbering details are listed in the table.

Liveries
The whole series was delivered in the SAR Gulf Red livery with signal red cowcatchers, yellow whiskers and with the number plates on the sides mounted on three-stripe yellow wings. In the 1990s many of the Series 6 units began to be repainted in the Spoornet orange livery with a yellow and blue chevron pattern on the cowcatchers. Several later received the Spoornet maroon livery. In the late 1990s at least two were repainted in the Spoornet blue livery with outline numbers on the sides. In the Passenger Rail Agency of South Africa (PRASA) era after 2008, at least one was repainted in the Shosholoza Meyl purple livery.

Illustration

References

External links

Bo-Bo locomotives
Cape gauge railway locomotives
2930
Railway locomotives introduced in 1977
Union Carriage & Wagon locomotives